, often abbreviated as GS, is a genre of Japanese rock music which became popular in the mid to late 1960s and initiated the fusion of Japanese kayōkyoku music and Western rock music. Their music production techniques were regarded as playing a pioneering role in modern Japanese popular music.

Group sounds arose following the Beatles performance at the Budokan in 1966, and was strongly influenced by British beat music of the 1960s. Group sounds acts included the Tigers, the Tempters, the Spiders, the Mops, and the Golden Cups. The movement peaked in late 1967 when Jackey Yoshikawa and His Blue Comets  won the Japan Record Award.

See also
 Music of Japan
 J-pop
 Visual kei
 Japanese hip hop
 Japanese jazz
 Japanese reggae
 Japanese ska
 List of Japanese rock bands
 Enka
 Ryūkōka

References

External links
 Cutie Morning Moon - Dedicated to Japanese 1960s garage punk
 The Video Beat - What are the Group Sounds?
 Showapop - Group Sounds Record & CD articles in English
 Trans World '60s Punk:Cutie Morning Moon  - Provides Information Mostly About Garage Bands From Outside the United States 

Rock music genres
Japanese styles of music
Pop music genres
Wasei-eigo